Anna Maria Cànopi, O.S.B., (April 24, 1931 – March 21, 2019) was an Italian  Benedictine abbess and spiritual writer.

Life
Cànopi was born in 1931 in Pecorara, now in alta Val Tidone, Province of Piacenza, then part of the Kingdom of Italy. As a young girl, she became drawn to monastic life. This led her to enter the Benedictine Abbey of Viboldone, near Milan.

In 1973 Cànopi was chosen to lead a small group of nuns who were to establish the new Mater Ecclesiae Monastery, which was to be located on San Giulio Island, on Lake Orta. Under her leadership, the monastery flourished and was later raised to the status of a territorial abbey, with Cànopi being elected as the first abbess of the community.

Abbess Cànopi became widely known as an author of several books on biblical and monastic spirituality, and was considered a prominent scholar in patristic literature. She contributed to the publication of the official translation of the Bible by the Italian Bshops' Conference. She was also invited to write the text of the Via Crucis (Way of the Cross) used by Pope John Paul II on Good Friday evening at Rome's  Colosseum in 1993.

Works
Way of the Cross with Pope John Paul II (1994) 
La Grande Settimana: Commento spirituale ai testi liturgici e ad alcune melodie gregoriane (2007) Edizionne Paoline 
L'anima mia magnifica il Signore: Lectio divina sul Magnificat (2008) Edizionne Paoline 
Siate lieti nel Signore: Lectio divina sulla Lettera ai Filippesi (2008) Edizionne Paoline 
Eredi di Dio, coeredi di Cristo: Lectio divina sulla Lettera ai Romani (2009) Edizionne Paoline 
Scelti per essere santi: Lectio divina sulla Lettera agli Efesini (2009) Edizionne Paoline 
Le sette parole di Gesù in croce: Meditazione e preghiera (2009) Edizionne Paoline 
Mansuétude Voie de paix (2010) Médiaspaul France 
Fame di Dio: L’Eucaristia nella vita quotidiana (2011) Edizionne Paoline 
Misericordia e consolazione: Il Dio di Gesú Cristo (2015) Edizionne Paoline

Bibliography
Il silenzio si fa preghiera. Omaggio a madre Anna Maria Cànopi with Matteo Albergante and Roberto Cutaia (2020) Edizioni Paoline 
Anna Maria Cànopi. Madre per sempre. Badessa, mistica e poetessa with Roberto Cutaia and Matteo Albergante  (2022) Edizioni La Fontana di Siloe

References

1931 births
2019 deaths
People from the Province of Piacenza
20th-century Italian Roman Catholic religious sisters and nuns
Benedictine nuns
Benedictine scholars
Italian Roman Catholic abbesses
Italian Roman Catholic writers
Women religious writers
Translators of the Bible into Italian
20th-century Italian translators
20th-century Italian non-fiction writers
20th-century Italian women writers
21st-century Italian non-fiction writers
21st-century Italian women writers